In multiple countries' curriculums, social studies is the integrated study of multiple fields of social science and the humanities, including history, culture, geography and political science. The term was first coined by American educators around the turn of the twentieth century as a catch-all for these subjects, as well as others which did not fit into the traditional models of lower education in the United States, such as philosophy and psychology. One of the purposes of social studies, particularly at the level of higher education, is to integrate several disciplines, with their unique methodologies and special focuses of concentration, into a coherent field of subject areas that communicate with each other by sharing different academic "tools" and perspectives for deeper analysis of social problems and issues. Social studies aims to train students for informed, responsible participation in a diverse democratic society. The content of social studies provides the necessary background knowledge in order to develop values and reasoned opinions, and the objective of the field is civic competence.

Human Society and Its Environment (HSIE) is a similar term used in the education system of the Australian state of New South Wales.

History of social studies 
The original onset of the social studies field emerged in the 19th century and later grew in the 20th century. Those foundations and building blocks were put into place in the 1820s in the country of Great Britain before being integrated into the United States. The purpose of the subject itself was to promote social welfare and its development in countries like the United States and others.

An early concept of social studies is found in John Dewey's philosophy of elementary and secondary education. Dewey valued the subject field of geography for uniting the study of human occupations with the study of the earth. He valued inquiry as a process of learning, as opposed to the absorption and recitation of facts, and he advocated for greater inquiry in elementary and secondary education, to mirror the kind of learning that takes place in higher education. His ideas are manifested to a large degree in the practice of inquiry-based learning and student-directed investigations implemented in contemporary social studies classrooms. Dewey valued the study of history for its social processes and application to contemporary social problems, rather than a mere narrative of human events. In this view, the study of history is made relevant to the modern student and is aimed at the improvement of society.

In the United States through the 1900s, social studies revolved around the study of geography, government, and history. In 1912, the Bureau of Education (not to be confused with its successor agency, the United States Department of Education) was tasked by then Secretary of the Interior Franklin Knight Lane with completely restructuring the American education system for the twentieth century. In response, the Bureau of Education, together with the National Education Association, created the Commission on the Reorganization of Secondary Education. The commission was made up of 16 committees (a 17th was established two years later, in 1916), each one tasked with the reform of a specific aspect of the American Education system. Notable among these was the Committee on Social Studies, which was created to consolidate and standardize various subjects that did not fit within normal school curricula into a new subject, to be called "the social studies".

In 1920, the work done by the Committee on Social Studies culminated in the publication and release of Bulletin No. 28 (also called "The Committee on Social Studies Report, 1916"). The 66-page bulletin, published and distributed by the Bureau of Education, is believed to be the first written work dedicated entirely to the subject. It was designed to introduce the concept to American educators and serve as a guide for the creation of nationwide curricula based around social studies. The bulletin proposed many ideas that were considered radical at the time, and it is regarded by many educators as one of the most controversial educational resources of the early twentieth century.

In the years after its release, the bulletin received criticism from educators on its vagueness, especially in regards to the definition of Social Studies itself. Critics often point to Section 1 of the report, which vaguely defines Social Studies as "understood to be those whose subject matter relates directly to the organization and development of human society, and to man as a member of social groups."

The changes to the field of study never fully materialized until the 1950s, when changes occurred at the state and national levels that dictated the curriculum and the preparation standards of its teacher. This led to a decrease in the amount of factual knowledge being delivered instead of focusing on key concepts, generalizations, and intellectual skills. Eventually, around the 1980s and 1990s, the development of computer technologies helped grow the publishing industry. Textbooks were created around the curriculum of each state and that coupled with the increase in political factors from globalization and growing economies lead to changes in the public and private education system. Now came the influx of national curriculum standards, from the increase of testing to the accountability of teachers and school districts shifting the social study education system to what it is today.

Subject fields 
Social studies is not a subject, instead functioning as a field of study that incorporates many different subjects. It primarily includes the subjects of history, geography, economics, civics and sociology. Through all of that, the elements of ethics, psychology, philosophy, anthropology, art and literature are incorporated into the subject field itself. The field of study itself focuses on human beings and their respective relationships. With that, many of these subjects include some form of social utility that is beneficial to the subject field itself.

Teaching social studies 
To teach social studies in the United States, one must obtain a valid teaching certification to teach in that given state and a valid subject specific certification in social studies. The social studies certification process focuses on the core areas: history, geography, economics, civics and political science. Each state has specific requirements for the certification process and the teacher must follow the specific guidelines of the state they wish to teach.

Ten themes of social studies 
According to the National Council for the Social Studies, there are ten themes that represent the standards about human experience that is constituted in the effectiveness of social studies as a subject study from pre-K through 12th grade.

Culture 
The study of culture and diversity allows learners to experience culture through all stages from learning to adaptation, shaping their respective lives and society itself. This social studies theme includes the principles of multiculturalism, a field of study in its own right that aims to achieve greater understanding between culturally diverse groups of students as well as including the experiences of culturally diverse learners in the curriculum.

Time, continuity, and change 
Learners examine the past and the history of events that lead to the development of the current world. Ultimately, the learners will examine the beliefs and values of the past to apply them to the present. Learners build their inquiry skills in the study of history.

People, places, and environment 
Learners will understand who they are and the environment and places that surround them. It gives spatial views and perspectives of the world to the learner. This theme is largely contained in the field of geography, which includes the study of humanity's connections with resources, instruction in reading maps and techniques and perspectives in analyzing information about human populations and the Earth's systems.

Individual development and identity 
Learners will understand their own personal identity, development, and actions. Through this, they will be able to understand the influences that surround them.

Individuals, groups, and institutions 
Learners will understand how groups and institutions influence people's everyday lives. They will be able to understand how groups and institutions are formed, maintained, and changed.

Power, authority, and governance 
Learners will understand the forms of power, authority, and governance from historical to contemporary times. They will become familiar with the purpose of power, and with the limits that power has on society.

Production, distribution, and consumption 
Learners will understand the organization of goods and services, ultimately preparing the learner for the study of greater economic issues. The study of economic issues, and with it, financial literacy, is intended to increase students' knowledge and skills when it comes to participating in the economy as workers, producers, and consumers.

Science, technology, and society 
Learners will understand the relationship between science, technology, and society, understanding the advancement through the years and the impacts they have had.

Global connections 
Learners will understand the interactive environment of global interdependence and will understand the global connections that shape the everyday world.

Civic ideals and practices 
Learners will understand the rights and responsibilities of citizens and learn to grow in their appreciation of active citizenship. Ultimately, this helps their growth as full participants in society. Some of the values that civics courses strive to teach are an understanding of the right to privacy, an appreciation for diversity in American society, and a disposition to work through democratic procedures. One of the curricular tools used in the field of civics education is a simulated congressional hearing. Social studies educators and scholars distinguish between different levels of civic engagement, from the minimal engagement or non-engagement of the legal citizen to the most active and responsible level of the transformative citizen. Within social studies, the field of civics aims to educate and develop learners into transformative citizens who not only participate in a democracy, but challenge the status quo in the interest of social justice.

References

External links
 The Social Studies in Secondary Education
 National Council for the Social Studies
 Changes in Social Studies
 History in Social Studies

Education by subject
Humanities education
Social sciences